Jean may refer to:

People
 Jean (female given name)
 Jean (male given name)
 Jean (surname)

Fictional characters
 Jean Grey, a Marvel Comics character
 Jean Valjean, fictional character in novel Les Misérables and its adaptations
 Jean Pierre Polnareff, a fictional character from JoJo's Bizarre Adventure

Places
 Jean, Nevada, USA; a town
 Jean, Oregon, USA

Entertainment
 Jean (dog), a female collie in silent films
 "Jean" (song) (1969), by Rod McKuen, also recorded by Oliver
 Jean Seberg (musical), a 1983 musical by Marvin Hamlisch

Other uses
 JEAN (programming language)
 USS Jean (ID-1308), American cargo ship c. 1918
 Sternwheeler Jean, a 1938 paddleboat of the Willamette River

See also 

Jehan

 Gene (disambiguation)
 Jeanne (disambiguation)
 Jehanne (disambiguation)
 Jeans (disambiguation)
 John (disambiguation)